Saint-Maurice-sur-Mortagne is a commune in the Vosges department in Grand Est in northeastern France.

Geography
The river Mortagne forms most of the commune's eastern border.

Population

See also
Communes of the Vosges department

References

Communes of Vosges (department)